Shirozua is a genus of butterflies in the family Lycaenidae.

Species
Shirozua jonasi (Janson, 1877) Amur Oblast, Ussuri, northeastern China, Korea, Japan
Shirozua melpomene (Leech, 1890) western China

References

External links
Images representing Shirozua at Consortium for the Barcode of Life

Theclini
Lycaenidae genera